"Dr. Funkenstein" is a song by the funk band Parliament. It was the second single released from their 1976 album, The Clones of Dr. Funkenstein. It reached number 46 on the Billboard Hot Soul Singles chart.

Dr. Funkenstein was one of George Clinton's many alter egos in the P-Funk mythology.

A live version of the song was performed by the  Red Hot Chili Peppers in the late eighties and appears on the 1998 compilation, Under the Covers: Essential Red Hot Chili Peppers.

In the 2015 Doctor Who episode "The Zygon Invasion", the Twelfth Doctor identifies himself as "Dr. Funkenstein".

References

Songs about fictional male characters
Parliament (band) songs
1977 singles
Songs written by George Clinton (funk musician)
Songs written by Bootsy Collins
Songs written by Bernie Worrell
Casablanca Records singles
1976 songs